Lehota nad Rimavicou is a village and municipality in the Rimavská Sobota District of the Banská Bystrica Region of southern Slovakia. Main activity of the locals had been forestry, agrobusiness and trade. Most important sightseeing is baroque-classical Lutheran church from 1796. In 2001 had been constructed Roman Catholic church.

References

External links
 
Photo gallery of Lehota nad Rimavicou
http://www.e-obce.sk/obec/lehotanadrimavicou/4-kulturne_dedicstvo.html

Villages and municipalities in Rimavská Sobota District